The 1892 Princeton Tigers football team represented Princeton University in the 1892 college football season. The team finished with a 12–2 record.  The Tigers recorded 12 shutouts and outscored opponents by a combined total of 473 to 18. The team's sole losses were against Penn and Yale.

Two Princeton players, quarterback Philip King and guard Art Wheeler, were consensus first-team honorees on the 1892 College Football All-America Team. Both were also inducted into the College Football Hall of Fame.

Schedule

References

Princeton
Princeton Tigers football seasons
Princeton Tigers football